M. Saravanan may refer to:

 Saravanan Murugan, Malaysian politician
 M. Saravanan (film producer), Indian film producer
 M. Saravanan (film director), Tamil film director